Backus is an unincorporated community in Fayette County, West Virginia, United States. It was also known as Naoma and War Ridge.

W. P. Backus, an early postmaster, gave the community his name.

References 

Unincorporated communities in West Virginia
Unincorporated communities in Fayette County, West Virginia